Saphier is a surname. Notable people with the surname include:

Nicole Saphier (born 1982), American radiologist 
Regina Saphier, Hungarian writer